This is a list of episodes for the 1969 game show The Generation Gap. Each week, musical guests would appear and perform, while various celebrities appeared as both "special guests" and contestants. These included Looney Tunes voice actor Mel Blanc, Dark Shadows co-star David Henesy, and future To Tell the Truth host Garry Moore.

The series first taped a pilot in Fall 1968, after which the series ran for 16 episodes from February 7 to May 23, 1969. Dennis Wholey hosted the pilot and first ten episodes, followed by Jack Barry for the last six.

Dennis Wholey

Jack Barry

References

Lists of American non-fiction television series episodes